San Isidro, officially the Municipality of San Isidro, is a 5th class municipality in the province of Davao del Norte, Philippines. According to the 2020 census, it has a population of 27,233 people.

History
San Isidro was created on June 26, 2004, after the ratification of Republic Act (RA) No. 9265. It was formed out of 6 barangays of Asuncion and 7 barangays of Kapalong.

Davao del Norte Representative and former Speaker Pantaleon Alvarez filed House Bill No. 9452 renaming the municipality to Sawata. It passed on third and final reading by the House on August 3, 2021 and on the Senate on January 31, 2022.

On June 2, 2022, RA No. 11814, the act renaming San Isidro as Sawata, as well as its municipal proper, Barangay Sawata as Poblacion, lapsed into law. A plebiscite, having no final schedule yet, will be supervised by the Commission on Elections.

Geography

Climate

Barangays
San Isidro is politically subdivided into 13 barangays.

 Dacudao
 Datu Balong
 Igangon
 Kipalili
 Libuton
 Linao
 Mamangan
 Monte Dujali
 Pinamuno
 Sabangan
 San Miguel
 Santo Niño
 Sawata (Poblacion)

Demographics

Economy

References

External links
   San Isidro Profile at the DTI Cities and Municipalities Competitive Index
 [ Philippine Standard Geographic Code]
Philippine Census Information
Local Governance Performance Management System
San Isidro Davao Del Norte Official site

Municipalities of Davao del Norte